Bryocorinae is a subfamily of bugs in the family Miridae.

Tribes and genera
BioLib includes:

Brycorini
Auth: Schuh, 1976
 Aspidobothrus Reuter, 1907
 Bromeliaemiris Schumacher, 1919

Bryocorini
Auth: Baerensprung, 1860
 Amapafurius Carvalho, 1981
 Bryocoris Fallén, 1829
 Bryophilocapsus Yasunaga, 2000
 Clypeocoris Carvalho, 1989
 Hekista Kirkaldy, 1902
 Kunungua Carvalho, 1951
 Monalocoris Dahlbom, 1851
 Vitoriacoris Carvalho, 1989

Dicyphini
Auth.: Reuter, 1883 includes the subtribes: Dicyphina, Monaloniina and Odoniellina; selected genera:
 Campyloneura Fieber, 1861
 Dicyphus Fieber, 1858
 Engytatus Reuter, 1875
 Helopeltis Signoret, 1858
 Monalonion Herrich-Schäffer, 1850
 Distantiella China, 1944
 Odoniella Haglund, 1895
 Sahlbergella Haglund, 1895

Eccritotarsini
Auth.: Berg, 1884
 Adneella Carvalho, 1960
 Ambunticoris Carvalho, 1981
 Aspidobothrys Reuter, 1907
 Bothrophorella Reuter, 1907
 Bryocorellisca Carvalho, 1981
 Carinimiris Carvalho, 1981
 Caulotops Bergroth, 1898
 Crassiembolius Carvalho, 1981
 Cuneomiris Carvalho, 1981
 Cyrtocapsus Reuter, 1876
 Dioclerus Distant, 1910
 Eccritotarsus Stål, 1860
 Ernestinus Distant, 1911
 Eurychilella Reuter, 1908
 Eurychiloides Carvalho & Gomes, 1971
 Frontimiris Carvalho, 1981
 Halticotoma Townsend, 1892
 Harpedona Distant, 1904
 Hemisphaerocoris Poppius, 1912
 Hesperolabops Kirkaldy, 1902
 Mecolaemus Hsiao, 1947
 Mertila Distant, 1904
 Michailocoris Štys, 1985
 Myiocapsus Poppius, 1914
 Nabirecoris Carvalho, 1981
 Neella Reuter, 1908
 Neocaulotops Carvalho & Gomes, 1971
 Neofurius Distant, 1884
 Neoleucon Distant, 1884
 Neoneella Costa Lima, 1942
 Pachymerocerista Carvalho & Gomes, 1971
 Pachymerocerus Reuter, 1909
 Pachypoda Carvalho & China, 1951
 Palaeofurius Poppius, 1912
 Palaucoris Carvalho, 1956
 Parafurius Carvalho & China, 1951
 Perissobasis Reuter, 1892
 Prodromus (bug) Distant, 1904
 Proneella Carvalho, 1960
 Pycnoderes Guérin-Méneville, 1857
 Pycnoderiella Henry, 1993
 Sinervaspartus Henry & Howard, 2016
 Sinervus Stål, 1860
 Sinevia Kerzhner, 1988
 Sixeonotopsis Carvalho & Schaffner, 1974
 Sixeonotus Reuter, 1876
 Spartacus (bug) Distant, 1884
 Stenopterocorisca Carvalho, 1981
 Stictolophus Bergroth, 1922
 Sysinas Distant, 1883
 Taricoris Carvalho, 1981
 Tenthecoris Scott, 1886
 Thaumastomiris Kirkaldy, 1902

Other taxa
 The Felisacini, erected by Namyatova, Konstantinov & Cassis, 2016 is monotypic, containing the genus:
 Felisacus Distant, 1904.
 The Monaloniini Reuter, 1892 and Odoniellini Reuter, 1910 are now subtribes in the Dicyphini
 Genera incertae sedis:
 Pachyneurhymenus Reuter, 1909

References

 
Miridae
Hemiptera subfamilies